Nicholas Robert Shorey (born 19 February 1981) is an English former professional footballer who played as a left back or a defensive midfielder.

After beginning his career at Leyton Orient, Shorey moved to Reading in 2001, where he made just under 300 appearances over seven years while helping the team reach the Premier League. He joined Aston Villa in 2008, but was limited to fewer than 40 appearances over two seasons. While with Villa, Shorey was loaned out to Nottingham Forest and Fulham. He joined West Bromwich Albion for £1.3 million in July 2010, making 53 Premier League appearances over two seasons with the club. After four years away from the club, Shorey rejoined Reading in July 2012, but could only manage 21 appearances when he joined Bristol City the following season. He spent just five months with City before joining Portsmouth in January 2014, and then Indian Super League club Pune City in the summer of 2015 for the forthcoming season. After playing in every match for Pune City, Shorey returned to England in January 2016 with League One club Colchester United. He finished his playing career with National League South club Hungerford Town.

Shorey has represented England at full international level on two occasions, with both appearances made at Wembley Stadium in 2007 against Brazil and Germany. He also made one appearance for the England B team.

Club career

Leyton Orient
Born in Romford, London, Shorey grew up as a West Ham United fan. He started his career at Leyton Orient as an apprentice in 1998, where he signed his first professional contract in July 1999. He made his first-team debut during the 1999–2000 season as an 83rd-minute substitute during Orient's 1–0 Third Division defeat to Shrewsbury Town on 12 February 2000. He made his first start for the club on 7 March 2000 in a 2–1 defeat to Northampton Town. He made seven league appearances for Leyton Orient over the final three months of the campaign. He made nine further appearances for the club in the first half of the 2000–01 season, before making his final appearance on 20 January 2001 in Orient's 2–0 home defeat by Southend United.

Reading
Shorey joined Second Division club Reading initially on trial in February 2001 before signing a three-and-a-half-year contract on 10 February for an initial £25,000 fee, depending on appearances.

Shorey did not immediately break into the Reading first team until the 2001–02 season, when he made his debut starting in the Royals' 4–0 defeat of Luton Town in the League Cup first round on 21 August 2001. He made his next appearance, again in the Cup, on 10 October during Reading's 1–0 defeat by Aston Villa at Villa Park. From then onwards, Shorey established himself in the first-team, where he made 36 further appearances for the first-team and helped the club to second position in the Division Two table, achieving promotion to the First Division in the process.

Shorey remained a regular first-team member for the 2002–03 season, making 48 appearances across the campaign, including two appearances in the play-off defeats to Wolverhampton Wanderers. He scored his first professional goal on 29 October 2002 in a 1–0 win against Bradford City at the Madejski Stadium. He scored his second goal of the season on 15 April 2003 when he scored from the penalty spot during a 5–1 win against Preston North End.

In the opening match of the 2003–04 season, Shorey was sent off during the 1–1 draw with Ipswich Town at Portman Road. He had another consistent season, racking up 41 league and cup appearances and scoring twice, once against Walsall on 28 December 2003 in a 1–1 draw, and another in a 2–1 win over Sheffield United on 28 February 2004. However, following the 0–0 home draw with Stoke City on 13 March, Shorey noticed that his foot has swelled and was throbbing, and by the time he reached hospital, the situation had become serious. Doctors had informed Shorey that they may need to amputate his foot. He received an intravenous drip in hospital for two weeks, and underwent treatment at his home for the following three months.

Shorey recovered in time to be involved in the first match of the 2004–05 season on 7 August 2004, a 3–2 home win against Brighton & Hove Albion. He scored three goals that season, with one in a 2–1 away defeat to Derby County, the only goal in a win away to Stoke, and the only goal in a win over Queens Park Rangers, on the way to making 48 appearances in all competitions.

In the 2005–06 season, Shorey was an important figure in the Reading team that won the Championship title and promotion to the Premier League with a record of 106 points. He also scored twice during the season, both of which were free kicks in consecutive matches against Norwich City and Crewe Alexandra. After making 44 appearances during the season, Shorey committed his future to Reading on 1 August 2006, signing a new deal to remain with the club until June 2009. He was named in the PFA Team of the Year for the Championship that season.

Shorey's transition from fourth tier to the top tier of English football was complete on 19 August 2006 when Reading hosted Middlesbrough at the Madejski Stadium. He played the full 90-minutes as Reading battled from 2–0 down to win 3–2. Shorey was nearly ever-present across the season, missing just one league match, while also scoring once during Reading's 3–1 win over Tottenham Hotspur on 12 November. Shorey was praised for his abilities not only defensively but also in going forward and his set piece play. An example of these abilities was seen in Reading's 6–0 win over West Ham United on 1 January 2007, with Shorey contributing to four of Reading's six goals. Owing to his impressive form during the campaign, helping Reading to an eighth-place finish in the Premier League table, Shorey was called up to the England B team by Steve McClaren for their match against Albania, and then became the first Reading player to represent the England national team in almost 100 years when he played in the first England match at the new Wembley Stadium on 1 June 2007. Shorey was runner-up to Ívar Ingimarsson for Reading's 2006–07 Player of the Season award.

Ahead of the 2007–08 season, Shorey was linked with a move away from Reading, with a number of Premier League club interested, while he had also reportedly turned down an improved contract offer from the club. Shorey later confirmed that he had no intention of leaving Reading despite the interest, although he later revealed he had made it clear to manager Steve Coppell that he wanted to move on, and a move a proposed move to West Ham United would have interested him but ultimately fell through.

Shorey's final season with Reading saw him make 39 appearances and score twice, once against Arsenal in their 3–1 defeat on 12 November 2007, and again in Reading's 2–1 home defeat by Aston Villa. Despite his near ever-presence, Shorey could not help his team from suffering relegation at the end of the season on goal difference.

Aston Villa

On 7 August 2008, Aston Villa signed Shorey on a three-year contract for an undisclosed fee, but Shorey did not rule out a return to Reading later in his career. Providing cover for the injured Wilfred Bouma, Shorey made his debut in the UEFA Cup in Villa's 4–1 away win against Icelandic team FH on 14 August.

After an inconsistent first season with the club, making 33 appearances across four competitions, a number of media reports suggested that Shorey was unsure whether or not his future lay at Villa Park, despite manager Martin O'Neill claiming previously that he had plans for the former Reading defender. Nonetheless, Shorey began the 2009–10 season in the Villa first team, starting their four opening league matches. On 1 September 2009, Shorey was set to make a season-long loan move to Portsmouth. Having travelled to Fratton Park to conclude the deal, Shorey decided against making the move, instead remaining with Villa.

Nottingham Forest loan
After struggling to hold down a first-team place at Aston Villa, Shorey made a loan move to Championship club Nottingham Forest for one month on 24 November 2009. He made his Forest debut on 28 November in their 4–1 home win over Doncaster Rovers, quickly becoming a regular starter. His loan was extended on 31 December until the end of January having helped the team to three clean sheets in five matches. Shorey played his final match for the club on 16 January 2010 against his former club Reading, a match in which he was sent off after 68 minutes. With his loan deal expiring at the end of January, Villa manager Martin O'Neill said that he had no intention of selling Shorey during the transfer window.

Fulham loan
Fulham signed Shorey on loan until the end of the season on 1 February 2010, seeing the player make his Premier League return following his loan spell in the Championship. The move was made with a view to a permanent move in the summer if Shorey sufficiently impressed Fulham manager Roy Hodgson. He made his debut for the Cottagers on 3 February in their 1–0 win over Portsmouth, going on to make twelve appearances for the club. He was cup-tied for Fulham's run to the 2010 UEFA Europa League Final.

West Bromwich Albion
Roberto Di Matteo signed Shorey for newly promoted Premier League club West Bromwich Albion on 9 August 2010, joining on a two-year contract while the club had the option of extending the deal for a further year. The transfer fee was £1.3 million. Shorey made his club debut in a 1–0 home win over Sunderland on 21 August. He made 31 appearances during the 2010–11 season, and made a further 26 appearances in the 2011–12 season. Shorey was released at the end of his second season with the club after Liam Ridgewell became the first-choice left-back at the club. He left the club on 16 May 2012.

Return to Reading
Much to Shorey's delight, he made a return to Reading in July 2012, following his acrimonious exit from the club in 2008. He signed on 10 July a free transfer in a one-year deal following his release from West Brom. He made his second debut for Reading on 22 September when his team were beaten 1–0 at the Hawthorns by his previous club West Brom, before scoring his first goal since his return in his next match, a 3–2 League Cup win against Queens Park Rangers on 26 September. After making 21 first-team appearances for Reading across the campaign, he was one of ten players released by the club after they were relegated back to the Championship after only one season in the Premier League.

Following his release, Shorey joined Brighton & Hove Albion on trial in June 2013, before training with Millwall in July 2013.

Bristol City
Having spent part of August 2013 training with League One club Bristol City, it was announced that Shorey had signed a short-term deal with the club on 30 August. He made his club debut the following day as a second-half substitute for Bobby Reid in their 1–1 draw at Gillingham. After 17 appearances, Shorey was released at the end of his four-month contract on 30 December.

Portsmouth
On 9 January 2014, Shorey signed for League Two's Portsmouth on a contract until the end of the season. He made his club debut on 11 January in Portsmouth's 0–0 draw with Oxford United, going on to make 21 league appearances until the end of the season.

Shorey signed a new one-year deal with Portsmouth on 27 May 2014. He would make a further 23 appearances for the club during the 2014–15 season, but he was released by the club when his deal expired on 18 May 2015 alongside seven other players.

Pune City
In September 2015, Shorey opted to join Pune City for the second season of the Indian Super League, which would run from October to December. He made his debut in Pune City's 3–1 win against Mumbai City on 5 October, and played in each of Pune City's 14 league fixtures as they went on to finish in seventh position of eight teams.

Colchester United
Shorey returned to England following his stint in India joining Colchester United on 20 January 2016. He made his debut for the League One club on 13 February in Colchester's 4–1 home defeat by Swindon Town.

After making 15 appearances for Colchester in 2016, the club announced at the end of the season that Shorey would not be offered a new contract following Colchester's relegation to League Two.

Hungerford Town
National League South club Hungerford Town signed Shorey on 2 September 2016.

Stevenage
In October 2016, having made three league appearances for Hungerford, Shorey joined Darren Sarll's coaching staff at Stevenage, with whose squad he had also been training since August.

International career
Following his good performances for Reading during the 2006–07 season, the Reading supporters introduced a "Shorey for England" song. As the season progressed, the media began to pay attention to the then uncapped player.

Shorey was called up to the England B squad to play Albania at Burnley's Turf Moor ground on 25 May 2007, and started the match before being substituted after 73 minutes with the score at 3–1 to England. He was replaced by Joleon Lescott.

Pundits had suggested that Shorey could make the step up to the senior squad, and on 26 May 2007, England coach Steve McClaren named him in his squad to face Brazil in a friendly match, and Estonia in a Euro 2008 qualifier. He made his full debut in England's first match at the new Wembley Stadium on 1 June 2007 as they drew 1–1 with Brazil, becoming the first Reading player in almost 100 years to represent the England national team at senior level.

Shorey earned his second and final England cap on 22 August 2007 in a 2–1 friendly defeat to Germany at Wembley Stadium.

Managerial career
On 8 October 2018, Shorey along with Glen Little, were appointed joint managers of Isthmian League Premier Division side, Wingate & Finchley. This was short lived as on 29 October he left his managerial role due to personal reasons.

On 2 July 2019, Shorey returned to Reading, taking up the role of Academy Lead Scout.

On 28 March 2022, Shorey was appointed as Head of Recruitment at League One side Gillingham, a role he departed on 6 December 2022.

Career statistics

Club

International

Honours
Reading
Football League Championship: 2005–06

Individual
Football League Championship PFA Team of the Year: 2005–06

References

External links

1981 births
Living people
Footballers from Romford
English footballers
English expatriate footballers
England B international footballers
England international footballers
Association football defenders
Leyton Orient F.C. players
Reading F.C. players
Aston Villa F.C. players
Nottingham Forest F.C. players
Fulham F.C. players
West Bromwich Albion F.C. players
Bristol City F.C. players
Portsmouth F.C. players
FC Pune City players
Colchester United F.C. players
Hungerford Town F.C. players
English Football League players
Premier League players
Indian Super League players
National League (English football) players
Expatriate footballers in India
English expatriate sportspeople in India
Stevenage F.C. non-playing staff
Association football scouts
Reading F.C. non-playing staff
Gillingham F.C. non-playing staff